Anaea aidea, the tropical leafwing, is a species of brush-footed butterfly (family Nymphalidae) in the subfamily Charaxinae. Its native range extends from Mexico to northwestern Costa Rica, with strays sometimes seen in southern Texas, Arizona, and California in the United States.  Some authors consider Anaea aidea to be a subspecies of Anaea troglodyta.

The larvae feed on Croton species.

References

External links
 

Anaeini
Butterflies described in 1844
Butterflies of North America
Nymphalidae of South America
Taxa named by Félix Édouard Guérin-Méneville